Adams & Prentice, Malmfeldt, Adams & Prentice, and Malmfeldt, Adams & Woodbridge were a series of American architectural firms in mid-twentieth-century New York City, with Adams & Prentice (fl. 1929–1941) being the most well-known, all established by architect Lewis Greenleaf Adams, AIA with various partners. The series of partnerships were the predecessor firms of the influential firm Adams & Woodbridge (fl. 1945–1974), which was functional from 1945 to 1974 with partners Adams and Frederick James Woodbridge, FAIA, formerly of the firm Evans, Moore & Woodbridge. Adams & Woodbridge later estimated in 1953 that their firm and its above-mentioned predecessor firms had been responsible for “about 100 residences and alterations.” In 1929, the office was located at 15 West 38th Street, Manhattan.

Works as Adams & Prentice (1929-1941)
1929: 255 West 34th Street, 6-story brick stores & loft building, built for 255 West 34th Street, Inc., (Theodore Margulis, President) at a cost of $45,000
1930: Brooks School (Andover, Massachusetts), $75,000
1930: Gnome Bakery (New York City), $10,000
1931: Richard B. Byrd School (Glen Rock, New Jersey). $85,000
1932: The Yale Daily News Building, Yale University, New Haven, Connecticut, $93,000 (as Adams & Prentice) or $100,000
1940: St. Bernard's School, Manhattan, New York City, $77,000 
1933: Lu Shan, Gladstone, New Jersey, the estate of Henry and Leila Luce.

Works as Malmfeldt, Adams & Woodbridge
1932: Wethersfield Church Home, Wethersfield, Connecticut, $100,000

Works as Malmfeldt, Adams & Prentice
1931: West Middle School for the Hartford, Connecticut, School District, $325,000 or $340,000
1931: Madison Beach Yacht Club (Madison, Connecticut), $80,000
1934: William R. Cotter Federal Building, $1,031,000 (as Malmfeldt, Adams & Prentice)  or $1,080,000.
1940: Edo Aircraft Factory for the Edo Aircraft Corporation, Long Island City, New York City, $305,000

References

External links
 Adams & Prentice works. Held by the Department of Drawings & Archives, Avery Architectural & Fine Arts Library, Columbia University.

1929 establishments in New York City
1941 disestablishments in New York (state)
Design companies established in 1929
Design companies disestablished in 1941
Companies based in Manhattan
Defunct architecture firms based in New York City
American ecclesiastical architects
American residential architects